was a town located in Sado Island, Niigata Prefecture, Japan.

On March 1, 2004, Sawata and the other 9 municipalities in the island were merged to create the city of Sado. Since then, Sawata has been one of the 10 subdivisions of Sado City.

Transportation

Bus
 Niigata Kotsu Sado
 Sawata Bus Station

Highway

See also
Sado, Niigata

References

External links
Sado Tourism Association 

Dissolved municipalities of Niigata Prefecture